Solomons may refer to:

Places 
 Solomon Islands, a sovereign state
 Solomon Islands (archipelago), an archipelago that includes the sovereign state nation of Solomon Islands and the Papua New Guinea island of Bougainville
 British Solomon Islands, the Solomon Islands apart from Bougainville before 1978
 North Solomon Islands, the area of the Solomon Islands archipelago previously under German control and covering Bougainville and what are now the northwestern provinces of Solomon Islands 
 Solomons, Maryland, USA
 Solomons Island: see Solomons, Maryland

Military 
 Solomon Islands campaign, a World War II campaign

People 
 Adolphus Solomons (1826–1910), American philanthropist
Adrian Solomons (1922–1991), Australian politician
 Anzel Solomons (born 1978), South African chess master
Burt Solomons (born 1950), American attorney
 David Solomons (accounting scholar) (1912–1995), British/American accounting scholar
 David Solomons (photographer) (born 1965), British photographer
 Levy Solomons (1730–1792), Jewish Canadian merchant and fur trader
 Nat Solomons (1858–1943), London-born Australian cinema entrepreneur and later mayor, chairman of the  Greater Wondergraph Company in the 1910s
 Ralph Solomons, a pseudonym used by Kent Walton (1917–2003) as film producer

See also
 Solomon (disambiguation)